Gay? is an extended play (EP) by 12 Rods. It was released on January 14, 1996, by V2 Records.

The EP is notable for being the first recording to receive a very rare 10 rating from Pitchfork upon its release, being one of the few albums to ever have done so.

Critical reception

AllMusic wrote that the EP "documents a formative stage in the band's evolution, as the songs here hint at space-country, ambient synth textures, and jazzy, quiet storm-influenced adult contemporary."

Track listing
 "Red" (6:17)
 "Make-Out Music" (3:51)
 "Gaymo" (6:09)
 "Mexico" (6:23)
 "Friend" (5:34) 
 "Revolute" (9:31)

References

External links
Gay? on the official 12 Rods website

1996 EPs
12 Rods albums
V2 Records EPs